Vincent Spadea (born July 19, 1974) is a former professional tennis player from the United States.

He reached a career high tenth position in the ATP Champions Race in April 2003, as well as a career-high 18th ATP ranking in February 2005. He has career prize money earnings of over $5,000,000. Spadea has ATP career singles wins over Roger Federer (1–2 record), Pete Sampras (1–4), Andre Agassi (2–4), Rafael Nadal (1–1), Andy Roddick (1–2), Pat Rafter, Richard Krajicek, Yevgeny Kafelnikov, Jim Courier, Michael Chang, Marat Safin, and Gustavo Kuerten. He is one of five players to defeat Federer 6–0 in a set at a main tour tournament, which he did at 1999 Monte Carlo. Spadea represented the United States at the 2000 and 2004 Olympics. Vince was also named twice to the US Davis Cup Team in 2000 (captain John McEnroe) and 2004 (captain Patrick McEnroe).

Spadea has one career ATP singles title and three ATP doubles titles. He also has eleven USTA Challenger Pro singles titles.

Personal life
Spadea was born in Chicago in 1974. His mother is originally from Colombia.

Spadea was Steve Carell's body double as Bobby Riggs in the 2017 film Battle of the Sexes.

Tennis career
At the 1999 Australian Open, Spadea achieved his best performance in a major by reaching the quarterfinals. In the fourth round at that tournament, he defeated the 1995 Australian Open champion, Andre Agassi. Spadea then lost to Tommy Haas in the quarterfinals.

On September 13, 1999, Spadea achieved a top 20 ranking for the first time. However, from October 1999 to June 2000, Spadea suffered a record losing run of 21 losses in a row. His losing streak led the Associated Press to dub him "the Charlie Brown of tennis" . He ended the streak in the first round of 2000 Wimbledon with an opening round 6–3, 6–7, 6–3, 6–7, 9–7 win over 14th seed Greg Rusedski, in a five-set marathon, which lasted for nearly four hours. Spadea's world ranking fell as low as 237 on October 23, 2000.

Working hard on the Challenger Tour after his fall down the rankings, he successfully recovered and eventually won his only career ATP Tour singles title in Scottsdale, Arizona, where he defeated James Blake and Andy Roddick along the way in 2004. He continued his journey back up the world rankings and was back in the top 20 by late 2004, although US Davis Cup captain, Patrick McEnroe, declined to pick Spadea as his second singles player for the 2004 Davis Cup final against Spain, opting instead for the lower ranked Mardy Fish. Spadea achieved his career-high world ranking of 18 in February 2005.

In 2003, Spadea reached the semi-finals of a Masters event for the first time in his career, losing to world No. 1, Lleyton Hewitt. He went on to the Monte Carlo Masters a month later and reached his 2nd semi-finals in a Masters series. This helped him reach a career high position of No. 10 in the ATP Champions Race in April.

In 2006, Spadea published his autobiographical book, Break Point: The Secret Diary of a Pro Tennis Player. Spadea criticized a number of tennis players including James Blake and Davis Cup captain Patrick McEnroe. He called out McEnroe for picking Mardy Fish ahead of him for the 2004 Davis Cup final where the Americans lost to Spain. Spadea criticized Blake for questionable character during a match where Blake allegedly "trash-talked" him. The book reached the top of the ranks in sports and tennis books during its debut month.

Spadea reached the third round at the 2008 Australian Open. In the first round, he came back from two sets down to defeat former world No. 8, Radek Štěpánek. He closed the season by winning two Challenger titles, in Waco and Calabasas.

Vince had an injury-stricken season in 2009, plagued by an overuse tendonitis arm issue, as well as a lower extremity staph infection. He won only a handful of ATP-level singles matches before the start of the clay-court season, but reached the semifinals of the Carson Challenger.

The New York Times summarized his career by calling him "the epitome of a tennis journeyman" and then noted that "he has played in 15 US Opens and has never reached the quarterfinals."

ATP career finals

Singles: 5 (1 title, 4 runner-ups)

Doubles: 5 (3 titles, 2 runners-up)

ATP Challenger and ITF Futures finals

Singles: 14 (8–6)

Performance timelines

Singles

Doubles

1This event was held in Stockholm through 1994, Essen in 1995, and Stuttgart from 1996 through 2001.

Top 10 wins

References

External links

 
 
 
 Official website
 Spadea's book wins ACE Magazine Book of the Year for 2006

1974 births
Living people
American male tennis players
American people of Italian descent
Olympic tennis players of the United States
Sportspeople from Boca Raton, Florida
Tennis people from Florida
Tennis players from Chicago
Tennis players at the 2000 Summer Olympics
Tennis players at the 2004 Summer Olympics
American sportspeople of Colombian descent